Frankie's House is a 1992 British-Australian TV drama based on the biography of British photographer Tim Page, especially focusing on his relationship with Sean Flynn - the son of Errol Flynn - during the Vietnam War.

It was first screened on the ITV network in the United Kingdom as four 50 minute episodes between 9 and 30 May 1992.

Soundtrack 
Frankie's House (Music From The Original Soundtrack) was composed and performed by Jeff Beck and Jed Leiber.

References

External links
 
 FRANKIE'S HOUSE (Parts 1/2) (1992) at Archive.org
 Frankie's House (Music From The Original Soundtrack)

1990s British television miniseries
1990s Australian television miniseries
1992 films